"The Shadow Kingdom" is a fantasy short story by American writer Robert E. Howard, the first of his Kull stories, set in his fictional Thurian Age. It was first published in the pulp magazine Weird Tales in August 1929.

The story introduces Kull himself, the setting of Valusia, Brule the Spear-Slayer (a supporting character), and the Serpent Men (who don't appear in any other work by Howard, but were adopted by later authors for derivative works and inclusion in the Cthulhu Mythos).

Plot
The story starts shortly after Kull, a barbarian from Atlantis, has conquered Valusia and become its King. Kull is invited to a feast by the Pictish ambassador for Valusia, Ka-nu the Ancient. Despite the fact that the Picts are ancient enemies of the Atlanteans, Ka-nu confides in Kull and tells him to expect the arrival of Brule the Spear-Slayer around sunset.

In the early night, Brule climbs into Kull's bedroom, identifying himself with a "bracelet of gold representing a winged dragon coiled thrice, with three horns of ruby on the head" which had been shown to Kull at the feast. Brule explains that Kull's life is in danger and shows him a series of secret passages which riddle the palace. Soon, Kull sees that the guards outside his room are all unconscious and their bodies hidden, although they still seem to be on guard at the same time. A visit by Chief Councillor Tu, with exposition from Brule, reveals the truth as Tu attempts to assassinate the sleeping King but meets him awake and armed; it was, however, not the real Tu but a serpent man who had taken on his appearance.

Brule reveals that the Serpent Men, an ancient pre-human race who had founded Valusia but were almost extinct, rule from the shadows, using their Snake Cult religion and ability to disguise themselves with magic. They intended on replacing Kull with a disguised Serpent Man, just as they had done with his predecessors.

The next day, the Serpent Men again attempt to replace Kull. He and Brule are, through an illusion, tricked into a separate room instead of the real council, surrounded by Serpent Men disguised as the councillors. Kull realizes the trap in time, however, and the two barely defeat their opponents. Heading into the real Council Room, they see another Kull. The imposter Kull is killed by the real one, revealing the fake as a Serpent Man and also revealing the truth of the existence of Serpent Men in general. The story ends with Kull's oath to hunt and destroy the Serpent Men for good.

Style
The subjects of masks and identity are repeated throughout the story.  The most obvious instance of this is the Serpent Men's ability of disguise through magic and their use of this to steal identities at will.

Kull, as a barbarian, sees the diplomacy and politics of Valusia (and the others of the Seven Empires) as a form of illusion. Early in the story, before the Serpent Men appear, Kull's thoughts on the matter are described: 

Musing on his own identity later in the story, Kull extends the mask metaphor to himself: 

This is touched on again shortly afterwards when, on seeing a Serpent Man masquerading as himself, Kull is momentarily confused:

Reception
Robert Weinberg praised "The Shadow Kingdom" as "an exciting novelette of swords-and-sorcery".

Adaptions

The story was adapted two times in comic books:
 Kull the Conqueror #2, September 1971 (Marvel Comics). Written by Roy Thomas, penciled by Marie Severin, inked by John Severin.
 Kull #2, December 2008 (Dark Horse Comics). Written by Arvid Nelson, art by Will Conrad

See also
 Reptilian conspiracy theory— Robert E. Howard's short story "The Shadow Kingdom" from Weird Tales magazine is the origin of both the sword and sorcery subgenre of fantasy fiction and the conspiracy theory concerning a hidden species of advanced reptilian beings disguised among us while covertly controlling the levers of power, which has been a recurring theme in fiction and conspiracy since the story's publication.
 Snake Men from Masters of the Universe
 Snake People from the TV movie The Archer: Fugitive from the Empire
 Reptilian humanoids in fiction

References

External links

Robert E. Howard bibliography at Fantasticfiction.co.uk

Short stories by Robert E. Howard
1929 short stories
Pulp stories
Works originally published in Weird Tales
Kull of Atlantis